Universal Music Enterprises (UME, stylized as UMe) is the catalogue division of Universal Music Group. It includes Hip-O Records, Universal Chronicles, and UM3 or UMC (which is the international division of the company). Under various divisions, it reissues many classic albums from the UMG back catalogue, and also various compilation albums, including series such as the 20th Century Masters - The Millennium Collection and Icon budget lines and the 2-disc Gold compilations. It also released Billy Ray Cyrus's album Wanna Be Your Joe and re-released John Cougar Mellencamp's American Fool and Tom Petty's Greatest Hits. In 2012, UMe took over distribution of Frank Zappa's recorded music catalogue.

In 2017, Styx signed with UMe for its latest album, The Mission. Later that same year, Universal announced the formation of Urban Legends, a new catalogue division, which focuses on reissues of said urban music releases.

References

External links
 

American record labels
Reissue record labels
Universal Music Group
Companies based in Los Angeles County, California
Companies based in Santa Monica, California